Warwick Davis (born 1970) is an English actor. He made his acting debut as Wicket W. Warrick in the Star Wars film Return of the Jedi (1983). He reprised the role in two television spin-offs: Caravan of Courage: An Ewok Adventure (1984) and Ewoks: The Battle for Endor (1985). He has since appeared in several Star Wars films, portraying numerous different characters, usually in cameos. He appeared in the cult-classic  Labyrinth (1986). He then played the protagonist in the Ron Howard-directed Willow (1988). In 1993, he portrayed the villainous Lubdan in Leprechaun. He returned to the role in Leprechaun 2 (1994), Leprechaun 3 (1995), Leprechaun 4: In Space (1996), Leprechaun in the Hood (2000), and Leprechaun: Back 2 tha Hood (2003).

In 2005, he played Marvin the Paranoid Android in The Hitchhiker's Guide to the Galaxy.

Film

Television

References

External links
Warwick Davis at IMDb
Warwick Davis at the Rotten Tomatoes

Male actor filmographies
British filmographies